The County of Svartsjö, or Svartsjö län was a county of Sweden from 1787 to 1809. It was separated the County of Stockholm and corresponds to the current Ekerö Municipality.

Former counties of Sweden